Irène Schweizer (born 2 June 1941) is a Swiss jazz and free improvising pianist. She was born in Schaffhausen, Switzerland.

She has performed and recorded numerous solo piano performances as well as performing as part of the Feminist Improvising Group, whose members include Lindsay Cooper, Maggie Nichols, Georgie Born and Sally Potter. She has also performed a series of duets with drummers Pierre Favre, Louis Moholo, Andrew Cyrille, Günter Sommer, Han Bennink, Hamid Drake, as well as in trio and quartet sessions with others, including John Tchicai, Evan Parker and Peter Kowald. With Yusef Lateef, Uli Trepte and Mani Neumeier, she performed at the Montreux Jazz Festival in 1967. One of her most enduring collaborations is with the improvising musician .

Discography

Solo
 Wilde Señoritas (FMP, 1977)
 Hexensabbat (FMP, 1978)
 Piano Solo Vol. 1 (Intakt, 1992)
 Piano Solo Vol. 2 (Intakt, 1992)
 Many and One Direction (Intakt, 1996)
 Chicago Piano Solo (Intakt, 2001)
 First Choice: Piano Solo KKL Luzern (Intakt, 2006)
 To Whom It May Concern: Piano Solo Tonhalle Zürich (Intakt, 2011)

Duo
 The Very Centre of Middle Europe (HatHut, 1978), with Rüdiger Carl
 Die V-Mann Suite (FMP, 1981), with Rüdiger Carl
 Irène Schweizer & Louis Moholo (Intakt, 1987)
 Cordial Gratin (FMP, 1987), with Joëlle Léandre
 Irene Schweizer & Günter Sommer (Intakt, 1988), with Günter Sommer
 Irène Schweizer/Andrew Cyrille (Intakt, 1989), with Andrew Cyrille
 Overlapping Hands: Eight Segments (FMP, 1991), with Marilyn Crispell
 Irène Schweizer & Pierre Favre (Intakt, 1992), with Pierre Favre
 Irène Schweizer & Han Bennink (Intakt, 1996), with Han Bennink
 European Masters of Improvisation (Captain Trip, Tokyo Tower Wax Museum, 1997), with Mani Neumeier
 Twin Lines (Intakt, 2002), with Co Streiff
 Ulrichsberg (Intakt, 2004), with Pierre Favre
 Where's Africa (Intakt, 2005), with 
 Live in Zürich (Intakt, 2013), with Pierre Favre
 Spring (Intakt, 2014), with 
 Welcome Back (Intakt, 2015), with Han Bennink
 Live! (Intakt, 2017), with Joey Baron
 Celebration (Intakt, 2021), with Hamid Drake

Trios and larger ensembles
 Jazz Meets India (SABA, 1967), with Mani Neumeier, Dewan Motihar, Keshay Sathe, Manfred Schoof, Kusum Thakur, Uli Trepte, and Barney Wilen
 Ramifications (Ogun, 1975), with Rüdiger Carl, Paul Lovens, Radu Malfatti, and Harry Miller
 Messer (FMP, 1976), with Rüdiger Carl and Louis Moholo
 Tuned Boots (FMP, 1978), with Rüdiger Carl and Louis Moholo
 Live at Taktlos (Intakt, 1986), with Lindsay Cooper, Joëlle Léandre, George E. Lewis, Paul Lovens, Maggie Nichols, and Günter Sommer
 The Storming of the Winter Palace (Intakt, 1988), with Joëlle Léandre, George E. Lewis, Maggie Nichols, and Günter Sommer
 Paris Quartet (Intakt, 1989), with Joëlle Léandre, Yves Robert, and Daunik Lazro
 Theoria (Intakt, 1992), with Barry Guy and the London Jazz Composers Orchestra
 Double Trouble Two (Intakt, 1998), with Marilyn Crispell, Barry Guy and the London Jazz Composers Orchestra, and Pierre Favre
 Ensemble Oggimusica Meets Irene Schweizer (Altrisuoni, 2000), with Ensemble Oggimusica
 Willisau & Taktlos (Intakt, 2007), with Fred Anderson and Hamid Drake
 Radio Rondo/Schaffhausen Concert (Intakt, 2009), with Barry Guy and the London Jazz Composers Orchestra
 Berne Concert (Intakt, 2009), with Trio 3 (Andrew Cyrille, Oliver Lake, and Reggie Workman)
 Jump! (Intakt, 2011), with the Jürg Wickihalder European Quartet

With Joe McPhee
Topology (Hat Hut, 1981)

References

External links

    
 http://www.intaktrec.ch/schweizer-a.htm
 FMP releases
 

Free jazz pianists
Free improvisation pianists
Swiss jazz pianists
Women jazz pianists
Swiss women pianists
1941 births
Living people
Avant-garde jazz pianists
People from Schaffhausen
21st-century pianists
FMP/Free Music Production artists
Intakt Records artists
21st-century women pianists